Francisco Parés Alicea is a Puerto Rican accountant and government official serving as the Secretary of Treasury of Puerto Rico since January 2019.

Biography 
Parés was born . He completed a bachelor's of business administration in accounting at the University of Puerto Rico, Río Piedras Campus. Parés earned a Master of Science in taxation from Northeastern University.

Parés is a certified public accountant and worked for Deloitte. He later became the assistant secretary for internal review and tax policy areas in the Puerto Rico Department of Treasury. In July 2019, he was nominated by Governor Ricardo Rosselló to succeed Raúl Maldonado as Secretary of Treasury of Puerto Rico.

References 

1988 births
21st-century American businesspeople
Deloitte people
Living people
Northeastern University alumni
Place of birth missing (living people)
Puerto Rican accountants
Secretaries of Treasury of Puerto Rico
University of Puerto Rico, Río Piedras Campus alumni